Kubadabad Palace or Kubad Abad Palace (also spelled:Qubadabad Palace) was a complex of summer residences built for sultan Kayqubad I (1220–1237), ruler of the Sultanate of Rum. The palace is located on the southwestern shores of Lake Beyşehir in south-west Central Anatolia, Turkey, just over 100 kilometers west of the Seljuq capital at Konya.

Site 

The site was formerly only known from the descriptions of the contemporary historian Ibn Bibi, who wrote that toward the end of his reign, Kayqubad himself drew up plans for the palace and assigned responsibility for its completion to his vizier Sa'd al-Din Köpek. The palace remains were discovered in 1949 and subsequently excavated, first in the 1960s by German archaeologist Katharina Otto-Dorn and more recently by a team from Ankara University led by Rüçhan Arık.

The complex comprises sixteen buildings, including two palaces, the larger of which is known as the Great Palace and measures fifty by thirty-five metres. Among its features are a game park and a small wooden dockyard that replicates the Tersane at Alanya. The Great Palace is an asymmetrical structure incorporating a courtyard, guest rooms, a harem and eyvan. It is remarkable for its ornate figural tiles, and its innovative layout, modeled on the caravansarai, reflects a break with the traditional pavilion structure that characterised earlier palaces.

Kubadabad Palace is unusual for a Seljuq palace in that its location is so far from a fortified town, in contrast to palaces at Konya and Kayseri. Protection seems to have been provided by a fortress complex located on the nearby island of Kız Kalesi. Other ruins in the area include the important Hittite site of Eflatunpınar.

Tiles

Excavations at Kubadabad Palace uncovered a magnificent series of polychrome ceramic tiles now held in Konya's Karatay Museum. Painted with an underglaze of blue, purple, turquoise and green, the series consists of white, star-shaped figural panels alternating with turquoise crosses. Similar tiling has also been found on the Roman theater at Aspendos, which Kayqubad had converted into a palace. The subjects of the tiles include humans, and animals both real and fantastic. Of particular interest are two tiles thought to show a portrait of the sultan and another showing a double-headed eagle inscribed "al-sultān."  The same symbols appear on other works sponsored by Kayqubad, such as the city walls of Konya.

See also
 Alanya Castle
 Artuklu Palace

References

Sources

Further reading

External links

  and 
 

Buildings and structures in Konya
Palaces in Turkey
Buildings and structures of the Sultanate of Rum